The Greenwood micropolitan area may refer to:

The Greenwood, Mississippi micropolitan area, United States
The Greenwood, South Carolina micropolitan area, United States

See also
Greenwood (disambiguation)